Minisink is a loosely defined region of the Upper Delaware Valley in parts of New Jersey, Pennsylvania, and New York, first settled in the 1690s.

Minisink may also refer to:

Minisink, New York
Minisink Valley Central School District
Minisink Valley High School
Minisink Ford, New York
 Minisink Archeological Site, a Native American site located in Sussex County, New Jersey and Pike County, Pennsylvania
 Battle of Minisink, a 1779 battle in the American Revolutionary War
 Minisink Angle, a colonial land grant in early 18th Century New York